Grønhøj is a small Danish town with a population of 209 (1 January 2010). It is located 15 km southwest of Viborg and 25 km south of Skive, near Alheden in central Jutland.

References

Cities and towns in the Central Denmark Region
Populated places established in 1760
Viborg Municipality